Sir William Montagu Manning  (20 June 1811 – 27 February 1895) was an English-born Australian politician, judge and University of Sydney chancellor.

Early life
Manning was born in June 1811 at Alphington, near Exeter, Devon, the second son of John Edye Manning and Matilda Jorden (née Cooke). William Manning was educated in Tavistock, Southampton and University College, London. Manning then worked for an uncle, Serjeant Manning and was entered at Lincoln's Inn in November 1827. He was called to the bar in November 1832 and practised as a barrister on the Western Circuit. In collaboration with S. Neville, Manning prepared and published Reports of Cases Relating to the Duty and Offices of Magistrates (3 volumes, 1834-8), and was the author of Proceedings in Courts of Revision in the Isle of Wight (1836). On 16 August 1836 in Paris he married Emily Anne Wise (sister of Edward Wise).

Career in Australia

In 1837 William and Emily Manning went to Australia on the City of Edinburgh, joining William's father who was registrar of the Supreme Court of New South Wales. Soon after his arrival in Sydney on 31 August 1837 was made a chairman of Quarter Sessions with a salary of £800. He took up his duties at Bathurst, New South Wales in October. In 1842 he was offered the position of resident judge at Port Phillip District, and in September 1844 became Solicitor General for New South Wales. In January 1848 he was appointed acting-judge of the Supreme Court of New South Wales during the absence of Mr Justice Therry. He resumed the position of Solicitor General at the end of 1849, and held this position until responsible government was established in 1856, when he retired with a pension of £800 a year. Manning was nominated to the New South Wales Legislative Council by Governor Fitzroy in October 1851, and assisted in the preparation of William Wentworth's constitution bill.

Manning was elected a member of the New South Wales Legislative Assembly in the first parliament, topping the poll for the South Riding of Cumberland. Manning was Attorney-General of New South Wales in the Stuart Donaldson ministry from 6 June to 25 August 1856. He was given the same position in the Henry Parker ministry in October 1856, but resigned on 25 May 1857 on account of ill-health. He was appointed a Queen's Counsel on 23 May 1857, the second NSW Barrister to be so appointed, and went to England. On 23 February 1858 Manning was knighted by the Queen Victoria.

On his return Manning was offered a temporary seat on the Supreme Court of New South Wales but declined it. On 21 February 1860 joined the William Forster ministry as attorney-general, but the ministry resigned about a fortnight later. In September 1861 he was appointed to the Legislative Council. He was again attorney-general in the John Robertson and Charles Cowper ministries from October 1868 to December 1870. In February 1875, though he was then a member of the upper house he was asked to form a ministry, but was unable to obtain sufficient support. Manning was appointed a Supreme court judge in 1876, requiring his resignation from the Legislative Council. He was primary judge in equity until his resignation in 1887. He voluntarily gave up his pension when he became a judge. On 8 February 1888 Manning was again nominated to the Legislative Council, and gave useful service there until near the end of his life.

University of Sydney

Manning had been elected a fellow of the senate of the University of Sydney in 1861, became chancellor in 1878 and held this position until his death on 27 February 1895 in Sydney.

Before Manning came into office the University had fewer than a hundred students in 1877, but during his chancellorship there was much expansion in the scope of the university and several new chairs were founded. He fought for and succeeded in getting increased grants from the government, stressed the need for more grammar schools to be created, and for the provision of university scholarships. He pleaded that women should have the same opportunities as men at the university and this was granted in 1881. Manning saved the university £15,000 by his discovery that the British taxation commissioners were charging succession duty on the John Henry Challis estate on too high a scale.

Manning's portrait by Sir John Watson Gordon, paid for by public subscription is in the MacLaurin Hall at Sydney University. He was knighted in 1858 and created K.C.M.G. in 1892. Manning married a second time to Eliza Anne, daughter of the Very Rev. William Sowerby on 7 June 1849. He was survived by a son and daughter from his first marriage; and his second wife and their son and three daughters. A daughter, Emily Matilda Manning (1845–1890), was a noted writer. Manning was buried in the cemetery of St Jude's Church, Randwick.

References

 

1811 births
1895 deaths
Judges of the Supreme Court of New South Wales
Members of the New South Wales Legislative Council
Members of the New South Wales Legislative Assembly
Australian Knights Bachelor
Australian Knights Commander of the Order of St Michael and St George
Chancellors of the University of Sydney
Attorneys General of the Colony of New South Wales
Solicitors General for New South Wales
Lawyers from Exeter
English emigrants to colonial Australia
Colony of New South Wales judges
19th-century Australian politicians
19th-century Australian judges
Australian monarchists
Lawyers from Devon
Australian King's Counsel